The Lancashire and Yorkshire Railway(L&YR)Class8 was a four-cylinder 4-6-0 express passenger locomotive designed by George Hughes introduced in 1908.

Design and construction
The increased weight of trains in the early 1900s and need for improved power on Liverpool—Manchester—Hull expresses and Leeds—Fleetwood boat trains indicated a need for an engine more powerful than the Aspinall's 4-4-2 Atlantic of 1899. Hughes described the requirement in a paper read to the Institute of Mechanical Engineers thus:

Hughes created a design with a boiler producing saturated steam, slide valves and Joy valve gear.

The first examples came out of Horwich Works in June 1908, and the original batch of 20 was completed in by March 1909. Around the time of their construction, they were nicknamed "Dreadnoughts" on account of their large size, after the then-new Royal Navy battleship .

The locomotives proved "sluggish, poor runners and poor steamers". They were subject to a number of modifications to improve steaming, including enlarged blast pipes and an air duct running to the front and rear of the ashpan in order to improve combustion.

The high maintenance demands of the class saw a queue needing attention building up at Horwich Works during World War I.  Remedial modifications were restricted but five were fitted with replacement modified boilers to keep them in service.

1919 rebuilding
From 1919 to 1920, fifteen were rebuilt with superheaters, piston valves, Walschaerts valve gear and slightly larger cylinders. The rebuilt locomotives were reported to be "a good workman-like engine" and "an engine thoroughly master of its work", although still with a coal consumption on the heavy side.

Later batches
Improved performance of the rebuilt locomotives and favourable test comparisons with the LNWR Prince of Wales Class and LNWR Claughton Class in 1921 and published in The Engineer were a trigger for the L&YR to order more of the type.

Deliveries of the ten locomotives in Lot 80 commenced in August 1921 with the last two being delivered after the amalgamation of the L&YR into the London and North Western Railway (LNWR) in 1922.  Deliveries from the 25 locomotives Lot 81 commenced in November 1922 with only four built before grouping and creation of the London, Midland and Scottish Railway and the remainder delivered in 1923. The 20 more of Lot 83 were originally part of the 30-locomotive order for the related L&YR Hughes 4-6-4T and were delivered during 1924 apart from the final locomotive No. 10474 on 5 January 1925.

Compound conversion trial

Build details

Service
The original unrebuilt locomotives were described as "poor performers". They were prone to suffering mechanical problems causing very poor reliability.  By 1918 there was a case of No. 1519, not one of the better of the class, was recording coal consumption of 100 pounds per mile between Southport and York.

During the length of the National coal strike of 1912 the unrebuilt Hughes 4-6-0 class were suspended because while able to "shift anything" the amount of coal they used in process was too excessive in a time of shortage.

The rebuilt version of the locomotive has been described as "creditable but not outstanding" and comparable to the LNWR Claughton Class.

As well as former L&YR territory the rebuilt class worked the West Coast Main Line mainly between Crewe and Carlisle but increasing less frequently south to Euston as the LMS Royal Scot Class became available.  The swansong was an enthusiast special excursion from Blackpool to York by what was described as an "old" locomotive on 1 July 1951.

Withdrawal
The relatively early withdrawal of most units must be considered in the context that the LMS inherited 393 different locomotive classes at Grouping, and LMS chairman Sir Josiah Stamp thought it desirable to reduce this to just 10 classes.  Also perhaps relevant is that while Hughes became chief mechanical engineer (CME) of the LNWR following its amalgamation with the L&YR and then CME of the LMS at the grouping, with his resignation in 1925, influence moved from Horwich to Derby.  In a paper presented to the Institute of Locomotive Engineers in 1946 E. S. Cox claimed that while the class were capable of some outstanding performances their "steaming, coal consumption and reliability were not outstanding" and seeming considered not suitable for general use on the Anglo Scottish as had been hoped.

Notes

References

 
 

08
London, Midland and Scottish Railway locomotives
4-6-0 locomotives
Railway locomotives introduced in 1908
2′C n4 locomotives
Scrapped locomotives
Passenger locomotives